The 1996 Vuelta a Andalucía was the 42nd edition of the Vuelta a Andalucía cycle race and was held on 19 February to 23 February 1996. The race started in Seville and finished in Granada. The race was won by Neil Stephens.

General classification

References

Vuelta a Andalucia
Vuelta a Andalucía by year
1996 in Spanish sport